Jean Schmit (9 August 1931 – 28 October 2010) was a Luxembourgian cyclist. He competed in the individual and team road race events at the 1952 Summer Olympics.

References

1931 births
2010 deaths
Luxembourgian male cyclists
Olympic cyclists of Luxembourg
Cyclists at the 1952 Summer Olympics
People from Dudelange